Bad Reputation is a 2018 American documentary film about the career of rock musician Joan Jett, directed by Kevin Kerslake and written by Joel Marcus. The documentary traces Jett's musical career from the formation of the Runaways through her subsequent partnership with songwriter and producer Kenny Laguna. Continuing with the creation of the band Joan Jett & the Blackhearts as well as the establishment of the record label Blackheart Records with Laguna, the narrative concludes with the induction of Joan Jett & the Blackhearts into the Rock and Roll Hall of Fame's Class of 2015.

Release 
The film had its world premiere at the Sundance Film Festival on January 22, 2018. The general release to theaters was made on September 28, 2018.

Interviewees

Soundtrack 

A companion soundtrack was released the same day as the film on Legacy Recordings with 17 tracks from throughout Jett's career.

Track listing

Vinyl edition

Reception

Critical reception
The site's critical consensus states, "Bad Reputation offers fans and novices a solidly entertaining overview of Joan Jett's trailblazing career, albeit one that might leave some viewers craving a deeper look." Metacritic, another aggregator, gave the film a normalized score of 66 out of 100 based on 15 reviews, indicating "generally favorable reviews".

Accolades

References

External links
 
 

2018 films
2018 documentary films
Documentary films about women in music
American documentary films
2010s English-language films
2010s American films